

Overview 
The Gairezi River begins on the slope's of Zimbabwe's highest mountain, the 2,592 meter Mount Nyangani, and is located in eastern Zimbabwe. As it winds its way north from the Eastern Highlands, and for more than 60 km, it subsequently forms the border between Zimbabwe and Mozambique before joining the Mazowe and Zambezi Rivers—as well as the Luenha River, a tributary of the Zambezi—at approximately 160 km upstream.

The Gaizeri River runs through Nyanga, a town in Zimbabwe's Manicaland Province.

River system 

Rivers of Zimbabwe